Ethmia mongolica is a moth in the family Depressariidae. It was described by Rebel in 1901. It is found in Mongolia, Tibet and China (Gansu, Sichuan).

The forewings are fuliginous black with four black spots. The hindwings are deep fuliginous brown.

References

Moths described in 1901
mongolica